Schefflera brevipedicellata is a species of flowering plant in the family Araliaceae and is native to China and Vietnam.

Etymology
Schefflera is named for Johann Peter Ernst von Scheffler, a German physician and botanist.

Brevipedicellata means 'having short pedicels'.

References 

Flora of China
Flora of Vietnam
brevipedicellata